Cuproxena golondrina is a species of moth of the family Tortricidae. It is found in Carchi Province, Ecuador.

The wingspan is about 16.5 mm. The ground colour of the forewings is cinnamon, but more orange around the costal marking, with weak refractive strigulae (fine streaks). The hindwings are orange.

Etymology
The species name refers to the type locality, the Forest Reserve Golondrinas.

References

Moths described in 2008
Cuproxena
Moths of South America
Taxa named by Józef Razowski